Nafeesa Inayatullah Khan Khattak is a Pakistani politician who had been a member of the National Assembly of Pakistan, from August 2018 till January 2023. Previously she was a member of the National Assembly from June 2013 to May 2018.

Education
She has received matriculation education.

Political career

She was elected to the National Assembly of Pakistan as a candidate of Pakistan Tehreek-e-Insaf (PTI) on a reserved seat for women from Khyber Pakhtunkhwa in 2013 Pakistani general election.

She was re-elected to the National Assembly as a candidate of PTI on a reserved seat for women from Khyber Pakhtunkhwa in 2018 Pakistani general election.

References

Living people
Pakistan Tehreek-e-Insaf MNAs
Pashtun women
Pakistani MNAs 2013–2018
Women members of the National Assembly of Pakistan
Year of birth missing (living people)
Pakistani MNAs 2018–2023
21st-century Pakistani women politicians